Trout River is a river in the Northwest Territories of Canada. It is a major tributary of the Mackenzie River.

The river gives the name to the Trout River Formation, a stratigraphical unit of the Western Canadian Sedimentary Basin.

Course
It flows north and then east, through occasional rapids, receiving the waters from several creeks and lakes. The course becomes meandered before it is crossed by the Mackenzie Highway, where the river turns sharply west, then north.

See also
List of rivers of the Northwest Territories

Rivers of the Northwest Territories
Tributaries of the Mackenzie River